Charassognathidae is an extinct family of basal cynodonts known from the Late Permian of South Africa and Zambia. It was named in 2016 by the palaeontologist Christian F. Kammerer, who defined it as all taxa more closely related to Charassognathus gracilis than to Dvinia prima, Galesaurus planiceps or Procynosuchus delaharpeae. The family contains the genera Charassognathus, Abdalodon and Nshimbodon, with the latter two making up the subfamily Abdalodontinae.

References

Prehistoric cynodonts
Prehistoric therapsid families
Taxa named by Christian F. Kammerer